The GNAT Modified General Public License (short: Modified GPL, GMGPL) is a version of the GNU General Public License specifically modified for compiled units and for the generic feature found in the Ada programming language.

The modification is as follows:

As a special exception,  if other files  instantiate  generics from this unit, or you link  this unit with other files  to produce an executable, this  unit  does not  by itself cause  the resulting  executable  to  be covered  by the  GNU  General  Public  License.  This exception does not however invalidate  any other reasons why  the executable file  might be covered by the  GNU Public License.

The GNAT Ada compiler can automate conformance checks for some GPL software license issues via a compiler directive. Use pragma License (Modified_GPL); to activate the check against the Modified GPL.  The GNAT Reference Manual  documents the License  pragma along with other compiler directives.

See also

 Free software licences
 GNU Free Documentation License
 GNU Lesser General Public License
 OpenSSL exception
 GPL linking exception

References

GNU Project
Free and open-source software licenses
Copyleft software licenses
Ada (programming language)